Hatun Pinkilluni (Quechua hatun big, pinkillu a kind of flute, Aymara -ni a suffix to indicate ownership, "the one with a big pinkillu" or "the big one with a pinkillu", Hispanicized spelling Jatun Pinquillone) is a mountain in the Andes of Peru, about  high. It is located in the Puno Region, Sandia Province, Patambuco District. It lies southwest of the mountain Pinkilluni and northeast of Rit'ikunka and Q'alawaña. The ridge northeast of the mountain is named Huch'uy Pinkilluni ("little Pinkilluni", Uchuy Pinquillone).

References 

Mountains of Puno Region
Mountains of Peru